Charlotte Wells (born 13 June 1987) is a Scottish director, writer, and producer. She is known for her feature film debut Aftersun (2022), for which she received a number of accolades, including Gotham and British Independent Film Awards.

Early life and education 
Wells was born in Edinburgh. She attended secondary school at the independent George Heriot's School.

Wells was interested in film from a young age, but did not initially pursue it. She graduated with a Bachelor of Arts in Classics from King's College London and then a Master of Arts from Oxford University. She went into finance and rediscovered film through helping Callum Just, a school friend, run Digital Orchard, a post-production and DIT agency. She used this experience to apply to New York University's joint business and film graduate program with the intention of becoming a producer. She completed a dual Master of Fine Arts and Master of Business Administration at Tisch School of the Arts and the Stern School.

While at NYU, Wells created three short films: Tuesday (2015) featuring Megan McGill, which earned Wells the Best Writer Nominee at BAFTA Scotland New Talent Awards 2016; Laps (2016) featuring Thea Brooks, which earned Wells Special Jury Recognition at the SXSW Short Film Awards; and Blue Christmas (2017) featuring Jamie Robson and Michelle Duncan.

Career 
Wells was a fellow at the 2020 Sundance Institute Screenwriters and Directors Labs with her feature film debut Aftersun, which premiered at the 2022 Cannes Film Festival to critical acclaim. The film is a drama starring Paul Mescal and Frankie Corio. She received many accolades as a breakthrough director and appeared on numerous year-end lists. Aftersun received an Academy Award nomination for Paul Mescal's performance.

Accolades

References

External links

1987 births
Living people
Alumni of King's College London
Alumni of the University of Oxford
Film people from Edinburgh
New York University Stern School of Business alumni
People educated at George Heriot's School
Scottish women film directors
Tisch School of the Arts alumni
Year of birth missing (living people)